William John Cunningham (born June 3, 1943) is an American former professional basketball player and coach, who was nicknamed the Kangaroo Kid for his leaping and record-setting rebounding abilities. He spent a total of 17 seasons with the NBA's Philadelphia 76ers (nine as player, eight as coach), and two seasons as a player with the Carolina Cougars of the ABA.

One of basketball's all-time greats, Cunningham was elected to the Naismith Memorial Hall of Fame and honored by selection to both the NBA's 50th and 75th Anniversary Teams as one of its legendary players, as well as to the ABA All-Time Team.  He was All-ACC, the ACC Player of the Year, and an All-American in college, later named to the ACC 50th Anniversary men's basketball team honoring the fifty best players in Atlantic Coast Conference history.  As a professional he was selected to the NBA All-Rookie First Team, an NBA All-Star, All-NBA First and Second Team, an ABA All-Star, All-ABA First Team, and the ABA Most Valuable Player.  He was an NBA champion both as a player (1967) and as a coach (1983).

Early life 
Billy Cunningham was born in the Parkville section of Brooklyn, New York. His fame began while he was playing at St. Rose of Lima and later Erasmus Hall High School in Brooklyn, where he was the MVP in the Brooklyn League in 1961. That year, he was the First-Team All-New York
City, and a member of the Parade Magazine All-America Team.

College career 

Cunningham then went to the University of North Carolina, where he excelled. He once grabbed a record 27 rebounds in a game vs. Clemson on February 16, 1963. Cunningham also set a single-game North Carolina record with 48 points against Tulane on December 10, 1964. In his UNC career, he scored 1,709 points (24.8 points per game), and grabbed 1,062 rebounds (15.4 rebounds per game). Upon graduation, his 1,062 rebounds were the best in North Carolina history and he held single-season records for most rebounds (379 in 1964) and rebound average (16.1 in 1963).

Honors and achievements
 3-year letter winner (in his day, freshmen were ineligible for varsity athletics)
 All-Atlantic Coast Conference (1963–65)
 ACC Player of the Year (1965)
 All-ACC Tournament Team (1963–64)
 ACC Academic All-Conference (1965)
 A USBWA All-America (1964–65)
 Helms Foundation All-America (1965)
 Sporting News All-America 2nd team (1965)
 Team Captain (1965)
 Played in the East-West Game in 1965
 Played at the World University Games in 1965
 Named to the ACC 50th Anniversary men's basketball team, honoring the fifty best players in ACC history (2002)

Professional basketball career 

In 1965, Cunningham joined the Philadelphia 76ers of the National Basketball Association. He played 80 games, primarily as a sixth man, while averaging 14.3 points and 7.5 rebounds a game. At the conclusion of the season he was named to the NBA All-Rookie Team.

Cunningham was a member of the powerful 1967 Sixers championship team, which also featured Wilt Chamberlain, Hal Greer, Chet Walker, and Luke Jackson. In Game 2 of the 1967 NBA Finals, Cunningham scored 28 points during a 126-95 win over the San Francisco Warriors.

After Chamberlain left the team in 1968, Cunningham became the 76ers' franchise player. He would replace the injured and aging Luke Jackson as the starting power forward of the team, and averaged 24.8 points per game and 12.8 rebounds per game during the 1968–69 season while leading the 76ers to 55 wins.  After that season, he earned the first of what would be three straight All-NBA First Team selections.

On December 20, 1970, Cunningham scored 31 points and grabbed a career-high 27 rebounds en route to a 134–132 road win over the Portland Trail Blazers.

Cunningham signed a three‐year contract on August 5, 1969 to begin play with the American Basketball Association's Carolina Cougars in 1971–72. Contending that the Cougars had reneged on paying the remaining $80,000 of a $125,000 signing bonus due on May 15, 1970, he reversed himself and signed a four‐year, $950,000 contract extension to stay with the 76ers through 1974–75 on July 15, 1970. The Cougars' attempt to file an injunction against him was denied in United States District Court on September 24, 1971. The reversal of that judgment in the United States Court of Appeals  months later on April 5, 1972, meant that Cunningham was obligated to honor his Cougars contract until its expiration in October 1974. He announced on June 15, 1972, that he was going to play with the Cougars beginning with the upcoming season at press conferences in Charlotte and Greensboro, North Carolina which occurred almost simultaneous to the Sixers' introduction of Roy Rubin as its new head coach.

In his first ABA season, Cunningham averaged 24.1 points per game, 12.0 rebounds per game, and led the league in total steals.  He led the Cougars to the best record in the league and was selected to the All-ABA First Team and was named the ABA MVP.   During the post-season, the Cougars defeated the New York Nets in five games in the Eastern Division Semifinals to advance to the Eastern Division Finals.  In the Division Finals, the Cougars lost a tight seven-game series to the Kentucky Colonels, 4 games to 3.  In the 1973–74 season, Cunningham and the Cougars finished third in the Eastern Division and lost again to the Kentucky Colonels in the Eastern Division semifinals.

After the 1973–74 season, Cunningham returned to the 76ers, where he played until torn knee cartilage and ligaments ended his career as an active player early in the 1975–76 season. For his career, he scored 16,310 points, grabbed 7,981 rebounds, and recorded 3,305 assists in both the NBA and the ABA. He recorded 14 triple doubles in the NBA and 5 in the ABA, good for 43rd all-time in the NBA and 5th in the ABA. In 1996, Cunningham was voted as one of the 50 Greatest Players in NBA History as part of the NBA's 50th Anniversary. In October 2021, he was also named to the NBA 75th Anniversary Team. To commemorate the NBA's 75th Anniversary The Athletic ranked their top 75 players of all time, and named Cunningham as the 66th greatest player in NBA history.

Coaching career
He succeeded Gene Shue as head coach of the 2–4 76ers on November 4, 1977. During his tenure, the team featured Bobby Jones, Maurice Cheeks, Andrew Toney, Moses Malone, and Julius Erving. In his first playoff appearance, he led the Sixers to a 4-game sweep against the Knicks, before bowing down to the Bullets in six games. He reached both the 300 and 400-win milestones faster than any coach in NBA history. He led Philadelphia to the playoffs in every year as coach, and advanced to the NBA Finals 3 times, in the 1979–80, 1981–82 and 1982–83 seasons.  The 76ers lost to the Lakers in 1980 and 1982, but after acquiring Moses Malone, they finally got past the Lakers in 1983, winning the franchise's third (and most recent) NBA Championship as part of a 12–1 playoff run. Upon his retirement on May 28, 1985, his 454 wins as a head coach were the 12th best in NBA history. He holds the second-best regular-season winning percentage in league history of .698 (only Phil Jackson is ahead of him). He is still the winningest coach in Sixers history.

Beyond playing and coaching 
Cunningham joined the broadcast team for CBS in the 1976–77 season, often paired with Brent Musburger, leaving after the season ended to coach the 76ers. Cunningham would later rejoin the CBS broadcast team starting with the 1985–86 season, again often paired with Musburger, covering both the NBA as well as NCAA men's college basketball for the network. In 1987, Cunningham replaced Tom Heinsohn as the lead color commentator (alongside play-by-play man Dick Stockton) for CBS' NBA telecasts. Cunningham left CBS Sports the following season to join the Miami Heat expansion franchise as a minority owner; he ultimately sold his interest of the Heat on August 12, 1994. Cunningham was subsequently replaced on CBS by Hubie Brown, but would return to CBS to help fill in during the 1990 NBA Playoffs, partnered with Verne Lundquist. He then returned for one last year to help cover the 1991 NCAA men's basketball tournament, partnered with Dick Stockton once again.

Head coaching record

|- 
| style="text-align:left;"|Philadelphia
| style="text-align:left;"|
|76||53||23||.697|| style="text-align:center;"|1st in Atlantic||10||6||4||.600
| style="text-align:center;"|Lost in Conf. Finals
|- 
| style="text-align:left;"|Philadelphia
| style="text-align:left;"|
|82||47||35||.573|| style="text-align:center;"|2nd in Atlantic||9||5||4||.556
| style="text-align:center;"|Lost in Conf. Semifinals
|- 
| style="text-align:left;"|Philadelphia
| style="text-align:left;"|
|82||59||23||.720|| style="text-align:center;"|2nd in Atlantic||18||12||6||.667
| style="text-align:center;"|Lost in NBA Finals
|- 
| style="text-align:left;"|Philadelphia
| style="text-align:left;"|
|82||62||20||.756|| style="text-align:center;"|2nd in Atlantic||16||9||7||.563
| style="text-align:center;"|Lost in Conf. Finals
|- 
| style="text-align:left;"|Philadelphia
| style="text-align:left;"|
|82||58||24||.707|| style="text-align:center;"|2nd in Atlantic||21||12||9||.571
| style="text-align:center;"|Lost in NBA Finals
|- ! style="background:#FDE910;"
| style="text-align:left;"|Philadelphia
| style="text-align:left;"|
|82||65||17||.793|| style="text-align:center;"|1st in Atlantic||13||12||1||.923
| style="text-align:center;"|Won NBA Championship
|- 
| style="text-align:left;"|Philadelphia
| style="text-align:left;"|
|82||52||30||.634|| style="text-align:center;"|2nd in Atlantic||5||2||3||.400
| style="text-align:center;"|Lost in First Round
|- 
| style="text-align:left;"|Philadelphia
| style="text-align:left;"|
|82||58||24||.707|| style="text-align:center;"|2nd in Atlantic||13||8||5||.615
| style="text-align:center;"|Lost in Conf. Finals
|- class="sortbottom"
| style="text-align:left;"|Career
| ||650||454||196||.698|| ||105||66||39||.629

ABA and NBA career statistics

Regular season

|-
| style="text-align:left;"| 1965–66
| style="text-align:left;"| Philadelphia
| style="background:#cfecec;"|80* || ... || 26.7 || .426 || ... || .634 || 7.5 || 2.6 || ... || ... || 14.3
|-
| style="text-align:left;background:#afe6ba;"| 1966–67†
| style="text-align:left;"| Philadelphia
| style="background:#cfecec;"|81* || ... || 26.8 || .459 || ... || .686 || 7.3 || 2.5 || ... || ... || 18.5
|-
| style="text-align:left;"| 1967–68
| style="text-align:left;"| Philadelphia
| 74 || ... || 28.1 || .438 || ... || .723 || 7.6 || 2.5 || ... || ... || 18.9
|-
| style="text-align:left;"| 1968–69
| style="text-align:left;"| Philadelphia
| 82 || ... || 40.8 || .426 || ... || .737 || 12.8 || 3.5 || ... || ... || 24.8
|-
| style="text-align:left;"| 1969–70
| style="text-align:left;"| Philadelphia
| 81 || ... || 39.4 || .469 || ... || .729 || 13.6 || 4.3 || ... || ... || 26.1
|-
| style="text-align:left;"| 1970–71
| style="text-align:left;"| Philadelphia
| 81 || ... || 36.9 || .462 || ... || .734 || 11.7 || 4.9 || ... || ... || 23.0
|-
| style="text-align:left;"| 1971–72
| style="text-align:left;"| Philadelphia
| 75 || ... || 38.6 || .461 || ... || .712 || 12.2 || 5.9 || ... || ... || 23.3
|-
| style="text-align:left;"| 
| style="text-align:left;"| Carolina (ABA)
| style="background:#cfecec;"|84* || ... || 38.7 || .487 || .286 || .789|| 12.0 || 6.3 || 2.6 || ... || 24.1
|-
| style="text-align:left;"| 
| style="text-align:left;"| Carolina (ABA)
| 32 || ... || 37.2 || .471 || .125 || .797|| 10.3 || 4.7 || 1.8 || .7 || 20.5
|-
| style="text-align:left;"| 1974–75
| style="text-align:left;"| Philadelphia
| 80 || ... || 35.7 || .428 || ... || .777 || 9.1 || 5.5 || 1.1 || .4 || 19.5
|-
| style="text-align:left;"| 1975–76
| style="text-align:left;"| Philadelphia
| 20 || ... || 32.0 || .410 || ... || .773 || 7.4 || 5.4 || 1.2 || .5 || 13.7
|- class="sortbottom"
| style="text-align:center;" colspan=2|Career
| 770 || ... || 34.9 || .452 || .263 || .730 || 10.4 || 4.3 || 1.8 || .5 || 21.2

Playoffs

|-
| style="text-align:left;"| 1966
| style="text-align:left;"| Philadelphia
| 4 || ... || 17.3 || .161 || ... || .846 || 4.5 || 2.5 || ... || ... || 5.3
|-
| style="text-align:left;background:#afe6ba;"| 1967†
| style="text-align:left;"| Philadelphia
| 15 || ... || 22.6 || .376 || ... || .656 || 6.2 || 2.2 || ... || ... || 15.0
|-
| style="text-align:left;"| 1968
| style="text-align:left;"| Philadelphia
| 3 || ... || 28.7 || .558 || ... || .824 || 7.3 || 3.3 || ... || .... || 20.7
|-
| style="text-align:left;"| 1969
| style="text-align:left;"| Philadelphia
| 5 || ... || 43.4 || .419 || ... || .632 || 12.6 || 2.4 || ... || ... || 24.4
|-
| style="text-align:left;"| 1970
| style="text-align:left;"| Philadelphia
| 5 || ... || 41.0 || .496 || ... || .667 || 10.4 || 4.0 || ... || ... || 29.2
|-
| style="text-align:left;"| 1971
| style="text-align:left;"| Philadelphia
| 7 || ... || 43.0 || .472 || ... || .701 || 15.4 || 5.7 || ... || ... || 25.9
|-
| style="text-align:left;"|1973
| style="text-align:left;"| Carolina (ABA)
| 12 || ... || 39.3 || .502 || .250 || .687 || 11.8 || 5.1 || ... || ... || 23.5
|-
| style="text-align:left;"|1974
| style="text-align:left;"| Carolina (ABA)
| 3 || ... || 20.3 || .290 || .000 || .800 || 5.3 || 2.0 || 1.3 || .0 || 7.3
|- class="sortbottom"
| style="text-align:center;" colspan=2|Career
| 54 || ... || 32.4 || .440 || .167 || .688 || 9.5 || 3.6 || 1.3 || .0 || 19.6
|-

Honors
Elected to Naismith Memorial Hall of Fame (1986)
All-NBA First Team (1969, 1970, 1971)
ABA All Star, First Team (1973)
All-NBA Second Team (1972)
Four-time NBA All-Star
Elected to the ABA's All-Time Team
One of the 50 Greatest Players in NBA History (1996)
Named to the NBA 75th Anniversary Team (2021)
His number 32 jersey is retired by the Philadelphia 76ers; however, he allowed it to be worn by Charles Barkley for the 1991–92 NBA season. Barkley normally wore the number 34, but switched to 32 in honor of Magic Johnson, who had announced at the start of the season that he was HIV-positive.

See also
List of National Basketball Association single-game playoff scoring leaders

References

External links

 Billy Cunningham statistics

1943 births
Living people
All-American college men's basketball players
Basketball coaches from New York (state)
American men's basketball players
Basketball players from New York City
Carolina Cougars players
College basketball announcers in the United States
Erasmus Hall High School alumni
Miami Heat owners
Naismith Memorial Basketball Hall of Fame inductees
National Basketball Association All-Stars
National Basketball Association broadcasters
National Basketball Association championship-winning head coaches
National Basketball Association executives
National Basketball Association players with retired numbers
North Carolina Tar Heels men's basketball players
Philadelphia 76ers draft picks
Philadelphia 76ers head coaches
Philadelphia 76ers players
Small forwards
Sportspeople from Brooklyn